The 2021–22 Chicago Blackhawks season was the 96th season for the National Hockey League franchise that was established on September 25, 1926. The Blackhawks were led by Jeremy Colliton until he was fired on November 6, 2021, after the team started with a 1–9–2 record; he has been replaced by interim coach Derek King.

After the prior season was shortened and realigned due to the ongoing COVID-19 pandemic, the NHL announced that divisions and conferences would be used for the season. Realignment of divisions occurred as the Seattle Kraken began their first season in the Pacific Division while the Arizona Coyotes moved to the Central Division.

The Blackhawks were eliminated from playoff contention of April 5, 2022, after wins by the Dallas Stars and Nashville Predators.

Off-season

Trades and acquisitions
The Blackhawks traded two-time Norris Trophy-winner Duncan Keith to Edmonton on July 12, 2021, after 16 years with the Hawks. The Hawks received Caleb Jones, brother of Columbus defenseman Seth Jones in the trade. On July 23, the Hawks acquired Seth Jones from Columbus and signed him to an eight-year extension. Four days later, goaltender Marc-André Fleury was traded by Vegas to the Blackhawks.

Return of Toews
Blackhawk captain Jonathan Toews returned to the team for the season after missing the entire 2020–21 season due to an undisclosed injury which was later revealed to be chronic immune response syndrome.

Season summary

Sexual assault allegations
In June 2021, Kyle Beach (who did not disclose his name until after the Blackhawks released their report), a former Blackhawks prospect, filed a lawsuit against the Blackhawks organization for failing to file a proper police report or properly handle his report that he was sexually assaulted by video coach Brad Aldrich during the 2010 Stanley Cup playoffs. On October 26, the Blackhawks released the findings of the investigation conducted by Jenner & Block and announced general manager/president of hockey operations Stan Bowman and senior vice president of hockey operations Al MacIsaac resigned.  The Blackhawks promoted Kyle Davidson to serve as their interim general manager, and then formally named him general manager on March 1, 2022. The team also received a $2-million fine from the NHL for failing to adequately and timely address Beach's allegations.

Poor start and firing of Jeremy Colliton
Opening their season with six straight losses, the Blackhawks broke a 51-year-old NHL record previously held by the 1970–71 California Golden Seals for the most minutes played at the start of a season without holding a lead. At nine consecutive losses, the Blackhawks set a new record for worst season start in franchise history in a 1–0 loss to the St. Louis Blues on October 30, 2021.

Colliton was fired following the team's 11th loss of the season and with a record 1–9–2. King won his first game as head coach on November 7.

Standings

Divisional standings

Conference standings

Schedule and results

Preseason
The preseason schedule was published on July 19, 2021.

Regular season
The regular season schedule was published on July 23, 2021.

Player statistics

Skaters

Goaltenders

†Denotes player spent time with another team before joining the Blackhawks. Stats reflect time with the Blackhawks only.
‡Denotes player was traded mid-season. Stats reflect time with the Blackhawks only.
Bold/italics denotes franchise record.

Transactions
The Blackhawks have been involved in the following transactions during the 2021–22 season.

Trades

Notes:
 Chicago will receive a second-round pick in 2022 if Edmonton reaches the 2022 Stanley Cup Finals and Keith is among the top-four defensemen on the Oilers in time-on-ice during the first three rounds of the playoffs; otherwise Chicago will receive a third-round pick in 2022.
 Columbus will receive Chicago's 1st-round pick in 2022 if the pick is outside the top two selections; otherwise Columbus will receive Chicago's 1st-round pick in 2023.
 Chicago will receive Minnesota's 1st-round pick in 2022 if they reach the 2022 Western Conference Final and Fleury has at least four wins in the first two rounds; otherwise they will receive a 2nd-round pick.

Players acquired

Players lost

Signings

Draft picks

Below are the Chicago Blackhawks' selections at the 2021 NHL Entry Draft, which were held on July 23 to 24, 2021. It was held virtually via Video conference call from the NHL Network studio in Secaucus, New Jersey.

References

Chicago Blackhawks seasons
Blackhawks
2021 in sports in Illinois
2022 in sports in Illinois